AmeriCorps Florida State Parks is an AmeriCorps program hosted by Florida State Parks that began operating in 1997. Members earn an allowance and an educational award by performing a minimal of 1700 service hours within the program.

The program has 50 members that is divided into 30 Individual Placement members and two teams of 10 members that serve out of O’Leno (near Gainesville) or Wekiwa Springs (near Orlando) State Park.  These members primarily focus on resource management and travel to other parks to provide service.  The 30 Individual Placement members serve a specific park and may periodically join up with one or both of the teams for projects. The Individual Placement members are placed in parks throughout the state.

The work done by each member differs in accordance with the particular needs of the region  or park. However, all of the members engage in some amount of the following activities:

habitat restoration, usually through planting of native vegetation combined with invasive exotic species removal directed at imported trees and vines which displace the local ecosystem; substantial invasive populations include Australian pine, melaleuca, and Brazilian pepper
Building park access facilities such as nature trails, bridges, boardwalks, and fences
Bringing park facilities into ADA compliance by building wheelchair ramps and widening building entranceways
Prescribed burns designed to simulate small forest fires that would occur naturally
Cultural and historical restoration of state historic sites
Environmental education of the local community, through programs conducted within the parks, and through visits to local schools
Cultural and historical education through programs conducted at state historic sites

In the charter year of 1997, 50 charter members were recruited and interviewed by the three-member review panels. In the charter year of 1997, the Florida Park Service/AmeriCorps partnership recruited 50 members—10 each to serve in the five existing Florida Park Service districts (I-V).  Each district unit was assigned responsibilities and tasks prioritized within their home District, with work assignments varying from combating exotic invasive species to construction of roadside park facilities.  In January, 1997, the first 50 joint AmeriCorps/Florida Park Service members trained in residence at O'Leno State Park.  Recruits were trained in a number of subjects, from proper tree-felling techniques to wildfire behavior and controlled burning of forests.  Other recruits later earned a Florida Department of Agriculture  "Restricted Pesticide Applicators--Forest" licenses in order to conduct both invasive plant species and Southern Pine Beetle infestations.  In 1998, members were deployed to Bunnell, Florida to help with support activities in response to massive wildfires.  Members were also deployed in 1998 to help with disaster recovery after a massive cluster of tornados struck near Orlando, Florida.  In conjunction with FEMA, members helped remove debris, rebuild pasture fences, and assist with food distribution to displaced residents.

References

External links
AmeriCorps Florida State Parks website

AmeriCorps organizations
State parks of Florida
1997 establishments in Florida